The Armstrong House-Allen Academy, at 1200 Ursuline in Bryan, Texas, was built around 1910.  It was listed on the National Register of Historic Places in 1987.

It is a two-and-a-half-story frame house with weatherboard siding.  It has Classical Revival details.

References

National Register of Historic Places in Brazos County, Texas
Neoclassical architecture in Texas
Buildings and structures completed in 1910